Stephen Darrow Stacey (born 27 August 1944 in Bristol, England), is an English footballer who played as a full back in the Football League with Bristol City, Wrexham, Ipswich Town and Exeter City. He was the first footballer of African American heritage to play professionally in the United Kingdom.

Personal life
Stacey is from a biracial background. He was brought up in Bristol by his mother, a white Englishwoman, after his father who was a black American G.I. returned home to the US after World War II.

In 1974, he emigrated to Western Australia, where he spent four seasons in the first division with Floreat Athena and Rockingham City.

He was appointed by the Western Australian State Government to chair a committee to establish 'The Future Direction of Football in Western Australia.'

He has written a book 'The Colour of Football'  exploring his life as the first African American to play professional football in the UK.

References

1944 births
Living people
English footballers
Footballers from Bristol
Association football midfielders
Bristol City F.C. players
Wrexham A.F.C. players
Charlton Athletic F.C. players
Ipswich Town F.C. players
Chester City F.C. players
Exeter City F.C. players
Bath City F.C. players
English Football League players
Floreat Athena FC players